was one of 23 escort destroyers of the Tachibana sub-class of the  built for the Imperial Japanese Navy during the final stages of World War II. Completed in early 1945, the ship spent most of her brief career assigned to the Combined Fleet on escort duty. Nire was damaged during a bomber attack on Kure in June; although she was repaired, the ship was placed in reserve the following month. The non-operational destroyer was turned over to the victorious Allies when the Empire of Japan surrendered in August; Nire was scrapped in 1948.

Design and description
The Tachibana sub-class was a simplified version of the preceding  to make them even more suited for mass production. The ships had two Kampon geared steam turbines, each driving one propeller shaft, using steam provided by two Kampon water-tube boilers.

The main armament of the Tachibana sub-class consisted of three Type 89  dual-purpose guns in one twin-gun mount aft and one single mount forward of the superstructure. The single mount was partially protected against spray by a gun shield. The accuracy of the Type 89 guns was severely reduced against aircraft because no high-angle gunnery director was fitted. The ships carried a total of 25 Type 96  anti-aircraft guns in 4 triple and 13 single mounts. The Tachibanas were equipped with Type 13 early-warning and Type 22 surface-search radars. The ships were also armed with a single rotating quadruple mount amidships for  torpedoes. They could deliver their 60 depth charges via two stern rails and two throwers.

Construction and service 
Nire (Elm) was ordered in Fiscal Year 1944 under the Wartime Naval Armaments Supplement Program and she was laid down at Maizuru Naval Arsenal on 14 August 1944. The ship was launched on 25 November and completed on 31 January 1945. Nire was assigned that day to Destroyer Squadron 11 under the Combined Fleet for working up, and was briefly attached to the Second Fleet on 1–20 April. On 22 June, while at Kure, she was damaged during an air raid by USAAF B-29 Superfortress bombers; repairs at Kure Naval Arsenal lasted until 2 July. On 15 July Nire was reduced to reserve and her crew was transferred to her sister ship . The ship was turned over to Allied forces at Kure at the time of the surrender of Japan and was stricken from the navy list on 5 October. She was scrapped at Kure on 20 April 1948.

Notes

Bibliography

 
 

Tachibana-class destroyers
Ships built by Maizuru Naval Arsenal
1944 ships
World War II destroyers of Japan